Sonsonate is a department of El Salvador in the western part of the country. The capital is Sonsonate.

The department has a population of over 463,000 and an area of 1,226 km².

Created on June 12, 1824. The El Salvador National Parliament decided on January 29, 1859 to separate from the department the cities of Apaneca, San Pedro Puxtla, Guaymango and Jujutla and give these cities to Santa Ana Department.

Sonsonate City was the second capital of the Federal Republic of Central America in 1834.

The department remains the heart of the Pipil culture in the country, home to several ancient traditions and to most of the few remaining Nahuatl speakers in El Salvador.

It is an overwhelmingly agricultural area, with extremely fertile volcanic soils that once were the most valuable resource in Central America for the Spanish conquistadors who profited from its ancient cacao plantations.  Its name appropriately means "Place of 400 rivers" or "Place of many waters" as it receives well over 2,000mm (79 inches) of rain a year.

Municipalities 

 Acajutla
 Sonsonate
 Armenia
 Caluco
 Cuisnahuat
 Izalco
 Juayúa 
 Nahuizalco 
 Nahulingo
 Salcoatitán
 San Antonio del Monte
 San Julián
 Santa Catarina Masahuat
 Santa Isabel Ishuatán
 Santo Domingo
 Sonzacate

History
It is located at 65 Kilometers of San Salvador and at a height of 225 meters. It is in the margins of Centzunat, Sensunapan, or Grande River of Sonsonate. It is joined to the capital and Port of Acajutla through modern highways, as well as to Santa Ana and Ahuachapán.

Sonsonate was founded in 1552, with the title and name of Villa of Sagrado Espiritu, by Antonio Rodriguez. In 1553, Pedro Ramirez de Quiñonez and the bishop Francisco Marroquin gave it the name of Villa de la Santísima Trinidad. On April 1, 1824, it obtained the title of city and on June 12 of the same year, that of Departmental Head. In 1834, it was capital of the Central American Federation under the command of President Senator Jose Gregorio Salazar.

Its parochial church, although inspired by colonial style, is from a later date to the independence, since it was blessed on April 1, 1887. On the other hand, the church of Santo Domingo, of calicanto, brick, and tile, was built in 1726 under the advocacy of the Santo Angel de la Guarda. In 1834 it was seat to the federal authorities of Central America and from 1841 to 1846, to a school of 2nd teaching that was directed by Friar Jeronimo Zelaya.

In the park “Rafael Campos”, a column with the marble bust of the ex-president Rafael Campos (1813–1890) was erected in 1913. He was called the “Salvadoran Aristides”. During his administration, the first map of El Salvador (1858) was raised. The national army, under the command of General Ramón Belloso, fought and defeated the filibusters of General William Walker in the battles of Masaya and Granada, in Nicaragua.

Sonsonate is a corruption of Centzunat, slang in pipil that means: Big River and literally “Four hundred waters”.

Notable people
Rafael Barrientos was born in Armenia, department of Sonsonate in July, 1919. He was founder of the Orchestra of “Lito Barrientos”. Among the prizes received are: “The Congo of gold”, in Barranquilla, Colombia; “The Order of José Matías Delgado” and “Prodigal Son of El Salvador”.

Prudencia Ayala was born in Sonzacate on April 28, 1885. An influential women's suffragist, she was the first woman to run for President of El Salvador, at a time when women weren't even allowed the right to vote. She was supportive of labor unions and women's rights, and supported the peasant's uprising of 1932.

Jose Roberto Cea was born in Izalco on April 10, 1939. He is poet, novelist, narrator, and editor. He was part of the Committed Generation. In theater, his most well-known works are: Las escenas cumbres, Teatro de y una comarca Centro Americana. His novels: En este paisito nos tocó y no me corro. And in narrative: Chumbulúm el pececito de Darwin y Sihuapil Taqueisali.

Irma Dimas of Sonsonate was Miss El Salvador in 2005.

Claudia Lars was born in Armenia on December 20, 1899, and died in San Salvador on July 22, 1974. Her true name is Margarita del Carmen Brannon Vega. She was a poet that cultivated the sonnet and romance. She is considered the greatest lyrical voice of El Salvador of the 20th century. Her works: Estrellas en el pozo, Canción redonda, La casa de vidrio, Donde llegan los pasos, Tierra de infancia, Sobre el ángel y el hombre, and Nuestro pulsante mundo.

Francisco Malespín was born in Izalco on September 28, 1806 and was murdered in 1846. He was defender of culture and art. He was president of El Salvador in 1844.

Óscar Osorio was born in Sonsonate on December 14, 1910, and died in The United States on March 6, 1969. Corruption and repression reigned during his government, but the achievements in external politics were duly recognized. During his government, the Code of Work, the promulgation of the Defense Law of the Democratic and constitutional order were passed, and the “Chorrera del Guayabo” or the “November 5th” Dam, the Port of Acajutla, and the Institute of Urban Housing were constructed.

Salvador Salazar Arrué (Salarrué) was born in Sonsonate on October 22, 1899, and died in Los Planes de Renderos on November 28, 1975. He wrote stories, novels, poetry, and he painted. He liked the humbleness of rural people and belonged to the so-called Native movement. Among his plastic works are: La monja Blanca, La isla roja, La ciguanaba. In literature: Cuentos de barro, Cristo Negro, El Señor de la burbuja, O’yyarkandal, Eso y más, Cuentos de cipotes, Mundo nomasito-una isla en el cielo.

Agriculture

The most cultivated agricultural products are the basic grains, coffee, cotton, sugar cane, coconut, fruits, balsam trees, palm, tulle, and orchard plants.

Among the most remarkable manufacturing industries are those of dairy products, panela, sugar, tiles and bricks of mud, clothes, footwear, candles, soaps, and leather articles. Coconut trees are plentiful in the suburbs and thus the city is known poetically by the epithet “the city of the palms”.

The average annual temperature is 25 °C.

Traditions

Years ago, there was an exchange of products between the inhabitants of Cuisnahuat (Sonsonate) and Jayaque (La Libertad) during which these towns did a mutual visit; Cuisnahuat during the rainy season and Jayaque during the dry season. If the visit was not completed, it became a reason for war between these towns.

To celebrate this event, two pilgrimages are carried out each year; from Cuisnahuat to Jayaque in July (rainy season) and of Jayaque to Cuisnahuat in November (dry season). In these months, each town celebrates its patron festivities which get richer with the presence of the “Cumpas” to the level of Santos and Siblings.

Another of the traditions of Sonsonate is the “candle of the stick”, which happens during the last section of the year. The mayor of the city chooses the “mayor of the night festivities”. The mayor of the city gives authority to the mayor of the night festivities to rule the city during one night. Then, the mayor's first order is to capture everybody who is outside of their house in the city. The captured citizens must pay the “pasayuba bosu” (nahuat expression for ‘pay the ticket’). All the collected money is dedicated for charity institutions.

Typical Food

In Sonsonate there is also a diversity of typical food, but let us point out like traditional: the yucca, which is generally eaten boiled or fried. In both boiled or fried, “pepescas” (or small fish) and the fritada are used.

Corn tamales, as well as hen tamales, have their own taste and you have them together with corn atol or a cup of coffee, depending on the time of the day.

Another one of the traditional foods in Sonsonate is the “sopa de patas” eaten with a beer or soda, depending on the person's choice.

 
Departments of El Salvador